Muhammad Fadhil bin Noh (born 4 March 1989) is a footballer who plays for Warriors FC in the S.League.

A former youth international who played for the Young Lions, he was a member of the bronze medal winning Singapore football team during the 2009 Southeast Asian Games, scoring a goal in the bronze medal playoff against Laos as well.

Club career

Fadhil started off his S.League career with the Courts Young Lions in 2008. He spent three seasons with the Young Lions before he was conscripted for national service.

While serving his national service, Fadhil turned out for Home United in the Prime League.

On 2 January 2013, Woodlands Wellington announced that Fadhil had agreed to terms and will join them for the 2013 season.

He made his debut for the Rams on 5 March 2013 in an away game against his former club, Home United FC, coming on as a second-half substitute for Jang Jo-Yoon, and made his first start for the Rams against Warriors F.C. on 25 May 2013.

Club career statistics

Fadhil Noh's Profile

All numbers encased in brackets signify substitute appearances.

International career
Fadhil has a solitary appearances for Singapore, coming on as a substitute for Shukor Zailan in the 64th minute during a friendly match against Poland on 23 January 2010.

International appearances

References

1989 births
Living people
Singaporean footballers
Woodlands Wellington FC players
Home United FC players
Singapore Premier League players
Association football forwards
Singapore international footballers
Young Lions FC players
Southeast Asian Games bronze medalists for Singapore
Southeast Asian Games medalists in football
Competitors at the 2009 Southeast Asian Games